Alok Industries Ltd, is an Indian Textile manufacturing company based in Mumbai, India. with integration in both the streams, in cotton as well as polyester value chain. ISO 9001:2000 certified company. The company has created global sized capacities and expanded its markets across the global territories. Its main business involves weaving, knitting, processing, home textiles, ready made garments and polyester yarns. It exports 26% of its products to over 90 countries in the US, Europe, South America, Asia and Africa.

History
It was established in 1986. In 1989, the company set up its first polyester texturising plant. The company became public in 1993 and was listed on Bombay Stock Exchange and National Stock Exchange of India with an IPO of Rs. 4.5 Cr. The company Grabal Alok Impex Limited was amalgamated with Alok Industries on 1 April 1996.

Retail
Alok Industries has shutdown all its direct retail stores. However, they have started selling their products in Amazon India.

Financials 
As per the latest Annual Report (2022), total sales of the Company increased by 91.44% to Rs. 7,150.91 crore from Rs. 3,735.31 crore in the previous year. Domestic sales increased by 96.22% to Rs. 5,451.37 crore from Rs. 2,778.11 crore in the previous year. Export sales increased by 77.55% to Rs. 1,699.54 crore from Rs. 957.20 crore in previous year. Operating EBITDA (before exceptional items) was positive at Rs. 611.61 crore as compared to negative EBITDA (before exceptional items) of Rs. 432.63 crore in the previous year. Operating Profit Before Tax (PBT) (before exceptional items) was negative at Rs. 184.18 crore as compared to negative PBT (before exceptional items) of Rs. 1,190.78 crore in the previous year.  

Alok’s export business has increased to Rs. 1699.54 crore in the current year as against Rs. 957.20 crore in the previous period representing growth of 77.55%.

Share Holding 
The paid-up Share Capital of the Company as on 31st March, 2022 was 496.52 crore shares of Rs. 1/- each.

See also
 List of companies of India

References

External links
 Alok Industries

Companies based in Mumbai
Manufacturing companies established in 1986
Textile companies of India
Indian companies established in 1986
Reliance Industries
1986 establishments in Maharashtra
Companies listed on the National Stock Exchange of India
Companies listed on the Bombay Stock Exchange